Acalolepta scotti is a species of beetle in the family Cerambycidae. It was described by Stephan von Breuning in 1936. It is known from india.

References

Acalolepta
Beetles described in 1936